The Aeromarine M-1 was a two-seat training biplane ordered by the US Army's  Aviation Section, U.S. Signal Corps (USAAS) in 1917 and built by the Aeromarine Plane and Motor Company of Keyport, New Jersey.

Design and development
Originally known as Aeromarine Training Tractor, Aeromarine's chief designer, Charles F. Willard, designed a two place trainer in both land-plane and seaplane configuration. The land plane was designated the Aeromarine M-1 and was produced to US Army Specification No.1001. The seaplane version was later called the Aeromarine 39 and sold to the United States Navy (USN). Both aircraft shared much in common, aside from the undercarriage, the primary difference was that the M-1's wingspan was shorter than the Aeromarine 39.

Operational history 
Six aircraft were produced and assigned serial numbers 265/270. During Army testing, the aircraft proved to be unsuitable for a training. "Preliminary tests showed that the M1 was unstable in anything but level flight, and most spent the war years packed in their crates."

In 1920, there was a proposal to re-engine these aircraft with the Aeromarine 100hp motor

Specifications (Aeromarine M-1)

References

Biplanes
Single-engined tractor aircraft
1910s United States military trainer aircraft
039
Aircraft first flown in 1917